Simon Russell may refer to:

 Simon Russell (footballer), English footballer
 Simon Russell (composer), British composer for TV and film
 Simon Russell, 3rd Baron Russell of Liverpool, British peer

See also
 Simon Russell Beale, English actor, author and music historian